Ghost House is a 2017 American supernatural horror film directed by Rich Ragsdale.

Plot 
A young couple go on an adventurous vacation to Thailand only to find themselves haunted by a malevolent spirit after naively disrespecting a Ghost House.

Cast
 Scout Taylor-Compton - Julie
 James Landry Hébert - Jim
 Mark Boone Junior - Reno
 Russell Geoffrey Banks - Robert

References

External links 

2017 films
2017 horror films
2010s English-language films
American horror films
Films directed by Rich Ragsdale
2010s American films